The Marrngu languages are a branch of the Pama–Nyungan language family of Australia.

There are four members of the family, which all originated in Western Australia.

Mangala (Mangarla)
Marrngu proper
Karajarri (Garadjari)
Nyangumarta (Njangumarta)

Vocabulary
Capell (1940) lists the following basic vocabulary items for the Marrngu languages:

{| class="wikitable sortable"
! gloss !! Njängumada !! Garadjeri !! Mangala
|-
! man
| marŋu || marŋo || djiːbi
|-
! woman
| midawa || djando || malar
|-
! head
| djudju || guŋgulu || djida
|-
! eye
| bani || bani || mil
|-
! nose
| milja || milja || milja
|-
! mouth
| rira || djawa || rira
|-
! tongue
| djälin || djälan || djalan
|-
! stomach
| ŋaːlu || ŋaːlu || burma
|-
! bone
| ŋandi ||  || gamari
|-
! blood
| gunbulu || gunbulu || gunbulu
|-
! kangaroo
| bardjanin || bardjanin || wandjiri
|-
! opossum
| laŋgur || laŋgur || laŋgur
|-
! emu
| galaju || bidjaɖa || ganaŋandja
|-
! crow
| djawari || djawari || waŋgede
|-
! fly
| wɔdei || wanmin || wanmin
|-
! sun
| djandja || baːra || baːra
|-
! moon
| ɖaɖaɖa || ɖaɖaɖa || gilinman
|-
! fire
| wiga || djuŋgu || waɭu
|-
! smoke
| baɳɖi || ŋuɽun || ŋundjir
|-
! water
| ŋaba || ŋaba || ŋaba
|}

References